Ernest Chavez (born June 27, 1983) is an American mixed martial artist, who formerly competed in the Featherweight division of the Ultimate Fighting Championship.

College
Chavez attended California State University, San Bernardino and earned an associate degree's.

Mixed martial arts career

Early career
A professional since 2009, Chavez began his career competing for several regional promotions in his native Southern California, where he compiled an undefeated record before signing with the UFC in early 2014.

Ultimate Fighting Championship
Chavez made his promotional debut on February 22, 2014, at UFC 170 where he faced fellow newcomer Yosdenis Cedeno.  Chavez defeated Cedeno in a back and forth fight via split decision.

Chavez faced Elias Silvério on May 31, 2014, at The Ultimate Fighter Brazil 3 Finale.  Chavez suffered the first loss of his career, as Silvério finished Chavez via submission in the third round.

Chavez was expected to drop down to featherweight and face Mirsad Bektic on August 23, 2014, at UFC Fight Night 49.  However, Chavez was forced out of the bout with an injury and was replaced by Max Holloway.

Chavez faced Zubaira Tukhugov on October 4, 2014, at UFC Fight Night 53. He lost the fight via TKO in the first round, and was subsequently released from the promotion shortly after.

Mixed martial arts record

|-
|Win
|align=center| 10–2
| Adam Townsend 
|Decision (split)
|RFA 33: Townsend vs. Chavez
|
|align=center|3
|align=center|5:00
|Costa Mesa, California, United States
|
|-
|Win
|align=center| 9–2
| Justin Buchholz 
|TKO (punches)
| TWC 23 - Halloween Havoc 5
|
|align=center|1
|align=center|3:22
|Porterville, California, United States
|
|-
|Loss
|align=center| 8–2
|Zubaira Tukhugov
|TKO (punches)
|UFC Fight Night: Nelson vs. Story
|
|align=center|1
|align=center|4:21
|Stockholm, Sweden
|
|-
|Loss
|align=center| 8–1
|Elias Silvério
|Submission (rear-naked choke)
|The Ultimate Fighter Brazil 3 Finale: Miocic vs. Maldonado
|
|align=center|3
|align=center|4:21
|São Paulo, Brazil
|
|-
|Win
|align=center|8–0
|Yosdenis Cedeno
|Decision (split)
|UFC 170
|
|align=center| 3
|align=center| 5:00
|Las Vegas, Nevada, United States
| 
|-
|Win
|align=center|7–0
|Jorge Valdez
|TKO (punches)
|BAMMA USA - Badbeat 9
|
|align=center|3
|align=center|4:00
||Commerce, California, United States
|
|-
|Win
|align=center|6–0
|Tom Gloudeman
|KO (punches)
|BAMMA USA - Badbeat 8
|
|align=center|1
|align=center|1:21
|Commerce, California, United States
|
|-
|Win
|align=center| 5–0
|Josh Smith
|Decision (unanimous)
|FCOC - Fight Club OC
|
|align=center|3
|align=center|5:00
|Costa Mesa, California, United States
|
|-
|Win
|align=center|4–0
|Stephen Martinez
|Decision (split)
|LBFN 13 - Long Beach Fight Night 13
|
|align=center|3
|align=center|5:00
|Long Beach, California, United States
|
|-
|Win
|align=center|3–0
|Xavier Stokes
|TKO (punches)
|Fight Club OC - Night at the Fights
|
|align=center|1
|align=center|2:43
|Irvine, California, United States
|
|-
|Win
|align=center| 2–0
|Brandon Jinnies
|TKO (punches)
| BITB - Battle in the Ballroom
|
|align=center|1
|align=center|0:44
|Irvine, California, United States
|
|-
|Win
|align=center| 1–0
|Dionisio Ramirez
|Decision (unanimous)
|Apocalypse Fights 4 - War
|
|align=center|3
|align=center|5:00
|Coachella, California, United States
|
|}

References

External links

1983 births
Living people
American male mixed martial artists
Lightweight mixed martial artists
Featherweight mixed martial artists
Mixed martial artists from California
Ultimate Fighting Championship male fighters